Sanel Ibrahimović (born 24 November 1987) is a Bosnian footballer who plays for the Luxembourgish club FC Wiltz 71 as a forward.

He spent most of his career in the Luxembourg National Division, with over 200 appearances and 100 goals between four teams. During his time at Jeunesse Esch and F91 Dudelange, he won four each of the league title and Luxembourg Cup. He was the Luxembourgish Footballer of the Year in 2013–14 and the league's top scorer three times.

Club career
Born in Tuzla, then in the SFR Yugoslavia, Ibrahimović was in the youth system of FK Sloboda Tuzla from the age of 6, until at 16 his family moved to Luxembourg.  He returned to the Balkans and became a futsal professional in Croatia before returning to Luxembourg in 2008, settling with his family in Wiltz, a northern city with a large Bosnian community.

His first club was FC Wiltz 71 of the second-tier Luxembourg Division of Honour. As a non-European Union citizen, he required a work permit as a specialist to play for the team. The club president, former Luxembourg international Henri Roemer, hired him as a purported specialist in Bosnian cuisine for his hotel – though he had no actual expertise in this field. The team gained promotion, and he was top scorer in the 2010–11 Luxembourg National Division with 18 goals in 24 games. However, the club were relegated and he missed a penalty in their play-off against US Hostert.

Ibrahimović had been tracked by a scout from nearby French club FC Metz, but the game he attended saw Wiltz lose 15–0 to F91 Dudelange, and he joined FC RM Hamm Benfica in 2011 for a club record €35,000, and Jeunesse Esch a year later. In the final of the 2012–13 Luxembourg Cup, he scored twice in a 2–1 win over FC Differdange 03 at the Stade Josy Barthel. In 2013–14, he was again top scorer with 22 goals in 26 games, in addition to Luxembourgish Footballer of the Year. With only one goal fewer the following season, he was top scorer for the third time.

In June 2015, after his Jeunesse contract expired, Ibrahimović moved to F91 Dudelange on a three-year deal.

Ibrahimović was close to returning to Wiltz in January 2019, but stayed at F91 and won the league and cup double. In June that year, he joined Wiltz on a three-year contract.

Honours

Club
Jeunesse Esch
Luxembourg Cup: 2012–13

F91 Dudelange
Luxembourg National Division: 2015–16, 2016–17, 2017–18, 2018–19
Luxembourg Cup: 2015–16, 2016–17, 2018–19

Individual
Luxembourgish Footballer of the Year: 2013–14
Luxembourg National Division top scorer: 2010–11, 2013–14, 2014–15

References

1987 births
Living people
Sportspeople from Tuzla
Association football forwards
Bosnia and Herzegovina footballers
FC Wiltz 71 players
FC RM Hamm Benfica players
Jeunesse Esch players
F91 Dudelange players
Luxembourg National Division players
Luxembourg Division of Honour players
Bosnia and Herzegovina expatriate footballers
Expatriate footballers in Croatia
Bosnia and Herzegovina expatriate sportspeople in Croatia
Expatriate footballers in Luxembourg
Bosnia and Herzegovina expatriate sportspeople in Luxembourg